Namita Saha is an Indian politician. She was elected to the West Bengal Legislative Assembly from Magrahat Purba as a member of the Trinamool Congress.

References

Living people
Trinamool Congress politicians from West Bengal
Year of birth missing (living people)
West Bengal MLAs 2021–2026
21st-century Indian politicians
21st-century Indian women politicians
Indian politicians